De Moor is a Dutch surname. It literally means "the Moor" and probably referred to the harbour master profession (to "moor" a boat). It may have also referred to a person with a darker skin, or more generally, a person with connections to the African continent. "De Moor" therefore meaning "The Dark Skinned People." Notable people with that surname include:

Bien de Moor (born 1962), Belgian actress 
Bob de Moor (1925–1992), Belgian comics author
Carel de Moor (1655–1738), Dutch etcher and painter, father of:
Carel Isaak de Moor (1695–1738), Dutch lithographer and painter
Des de Moor (born 1961), English musician
Duncan de Moor (born 1994), also known as Duncan Laurence, Dutch musician
Frans de Moor (1912–1983), Dutch boxer
Georges De Moor (born 1953), Belgian Doctor of Medicine and professor
Joos de Moor (c. 1548 – 1618), Dutch Vice Admiral
Marente de Moor (born 1972), Dutch writer and columnist
Margriet de Moor (born 1941), Dutch writer and pianist
Ruud de Moor (1928–2001), Dutch professor of sociology
Vincent de Moor (born 1973), Dutch trance artist

See also
Guido Demoor (1952–2006), Belgian train driver
Moor (disambiguation)

References 

Dutch-language surnames